Rhea may refer to:

 Rhea (bird), genus of flightless birds native to South America
 Rhea (mythology), a Titan in Greek mythology

It may also refer to:

People
Rhea (name), list of people with this name

Mythology
 Rhea Silvia, in Roman mythology the mother of the twins Romulus and Remus
 Rhea (mother of Aventinus), mother of Aventinus by Hercules
 Rhea or Riadh, Celtic mythological hero

Science and technology
 Rhea (moon), a moon of Saturn
 577 Rhea, an asteroid
 Green ramie or rhea, a bast fibre plant
 Rhea (pipeline), a set of scripts in R for the analysis of microbial profiles

Places
 Rhea County, Tennessee
 Rhea Springs, Tennessee, a defunct town
 Île de Ré or Rhea, an island in France

Music
 Rhea, a 1908 opera by Spyridon Samaras
 Rhea, a 1988 composition for 12 saxophones by Francisco Guerrero Marín
 "Rhea", a song on the 1997 album Did Tomorrow Come... by Polish heavy metal band Sirrah
 Rheia (album), a 2016 album by Belgian band Oathbreaker

Ships
 USS Rhea (AMc-58), a coastal minesweeper launched in 1941
 USS Rhea (AMS-52), a minesweeper launched in 1942

See also
 Rhea County Courthouse, historic building in Tennessee, US
 Rhea–McEntire House, an historic mansion in Alabama, US
 Rea (disambiguation)